Garachico is a municipality and town on the northern coast of Tenerife, about 52 km West of the capital Santa Cruz de Tenerife, 50 km from Tenerife North Airport and 67 km from Tenerife South Airport. The town itself nestles below a 500m+ (1500 ft) cliff.

The city of Garachico with its port was founded by the Genoan banker Cristóbal de Ponte after the conquest of Tenerife in 1496.

The May 5, 1706 eruption originating from the northwest rift zone was a major event in the town's history. Prior to then, Garachico was an important  port exporting Malmsey Wine and other local produce. However, a several-week-long eruption poured lava into the old bay and effectively destroyed the town's livelihood. The town itself was partially destroyed. (Contrary to the 'Tourist trade' myth, which will tell you that the town was completely destroyed, except for the church where the townfolk took refuge.)

Garachico has always taken care of its environment and protected the most diverse cultural manifestations. For all these reasons, the Spanish government awarded the town the Gold Medal of Fine Arts, which was presented in 1980 by His Majesty the King.

Pictures

References

See also 

Roque de Garachico
Eruption of Trevejo (1706)
Port of Garachico
 Church of Santa Ana (Garachico)